Guglielmo Marconi is a public artwork by Attilio Piccirilli, located at the intersection of 16th and Lamont Streets, N.W., in the Mount Pleasant neighborhood of Washington, D.C., United States.  It stands as a tribute to Italian inventor Guglielmo Marconi.  It was paid for by public subscription and erected in 1941.  The artwork was listed on both the District of Columbia Inventory of Historic Sites and the National Register of Historic Places in 2007.  It is a contributing property in the Mount Pleasant Historic District.  The monument was originally surveyed as part of the Smithsonian's Save Outdoor Sculpture! survey in 1994.

Description
The sculpture features two bronze pieces.  In the front is a bust of Marconi (approx. 40 x 30 x 16 in.) which sits on a rectangular Stony Creek granite base (approx. 95 x 32 x 18 in.).  Behind the bust is the second bronze resting on another granite base (approx. 95 x 72 x 36 in.).  The second bronze is an allegorist female figure sitting on a globe with her legs stretched out behind her.  She points her proper left arm straight in front of her while her proper right arm is raised and bent at the elbow.  She is naked with a small piece of drapery on her lap.  According to Piccirilli, she is "the Wave", representing "Marconi's contribution to science..."

The base housing the Marconi bust features the inscription on the proper left side:

Attilio Piccirilli 1940.

On the same base's rear:

ERECTED BY POPULAR SUBSCRIPTION
AND PRESENTED TO THE CITY OF WASHINGTON
THE MARCONI MEMORIAL FOUNDATION
1940

On the front of the base:

MARCONI
1874–1937.

The statue is not without association to fascist art, since Marconi was strongly identified with Italian fascism, and Piccirilli's subsequent work at the Rockefeller center in New York was criticized for using language appropriated by Mussolini.

Gallery

Acquisition
The fund for the memorial was begun a year after Marconi's 1937 death. The total sculpture cost after completion was $32,555.

See also
 List of public art in Washington, D.C., Ward 1
 National Register of Historic Places listings in Washington, D.C.
 Outdoor sculpture in Washington, D.C.

References

External links

Guglielmo Marconi statue, dcMemorials.com
Nude sculptures in D.C.

1941 sculptures
Allegorical sculptures in Washington, D.C.
Artworks in the collection of the National Park Service
Bronze sculptures in Washington, D.C.
Busts in Washington, D.C.
Granite sculptures in Washington, D.C.
Cultural depictions of Guglielmo Marconi
Monuments and memorials on the National Register of Historic Places in Washington, D.C.
Sculptures of men in Washington, D.C.
Sculptures of women in Washington, D.C.
Rock Creek Park
Guglielmo Marconi